William Samuel Henson (3 May 1812 – 22 March 1888) was a British-born pre-Wright brothers aviation pioneer, engineer and inventor. He is best known for his work on the aerial steam carriage alongside John Stringfellow.

Biography
Henson was born in Nottingham, England on 3 May 1812. Henson was involved in lace-making in Chard and he obtained a patent on improved lace-making machines in 1835.  Henson is best known as an early pioneer in aviation, but patented many other inventions, some of which are in wide use today.

In 1849 William Henson and his wife, Sarah, left England and moved to the United States, joining his father and settling in Newark, New Jersey. Henson never did any further aviation research while in the United States and worked as a machinist, civil engineer and inventor.  He had 7 children, only 4 of whom lived to adulthood.

Henson remained in the United States for the remainder of his life, except for a short period between 1864–1866 when he lived in Peru. died on 22 March 1888 in Newark, New Jersey. He and most of his family were buried in Rosedale Cemetery in Orange, New Jersey.

Aeronautical inventions
Starting c. 1838, Henson became interested in aviation.  In April 1841 he patented an improved lightweight steam engine, and with fellow lacemaking-engineer John Stringfellow in c. 1842 he designed a large passenger-carrying steam-powered monoplane, with a wing span of 150 feet, which he named the "Henson Aerial Steam Carriage". He received a patent on it in 1843 along with Stringfellow.

Henson, Stringfellow, Frederick Marriott, and D.E. Colombine, incorporated as the Aerial Transit Company in 1843 in England, with the intention of raising money to construct the flying machine. Henson built a scale model of his design, which made one tentative steam-powered "hop" as it lifted, or bounced, off its guide wire. Attempts were made to fly the small model, and a larger model with a 20-foot wing span, between 1844 and 1847, without success.

Henson grew discouraged, married and emigrated in 1849 to the United States, while Stringfellow continued to experiment with aviation.

Henson appeared as a character in a fictional newspaper story by Edgar Allan Poe, which recounted a supposed trans-Atlantic balloon trip, in which Henson was one of the passengers on the balloon.

Henson and Stringfellow are frequently mentioned in books on the history of aviation.  The Royal Aeronautical Society holds annual "Henson-Stringfellow" lectures; as of 2008 they have held 52.   A glacier in Antarctica is named after him due to his work in aviation (Henson Glacier: 64'06'S, 60'11'W).

Henson and Stringfellow were referred to in the 1965 film The Flight of the Phoenix.

Aerial Design
The Aerial's wings were rectangular, and were formed by wooden spars covered with fabric, and braced, internally and externally, with wires. The Aerial Steam Carriage was to be powered by two contra-rotating six-bladed propellers mounted in the rear in a push-type system. The design follows earlier "birdlike" gliders, and the ideas of George Cayley, and Henson corresponded with Cayley in an attempt to obtain funding after the efforts to obtain the support of Parliament and sell stock failed. The Aerial Transit Company never built the largest version of the Aerial Steam Carriage because of the failed attempts with the medium-sized model. Henson, Stringfellow, Marriott and Colombine dissolved the company around 1848.

Advertising
The Aerial Transit Company's publicist, Frederick Marriott, commissioned prints in 1843 depicting the Aerial Steam Carriage over the pyramids of Egypt, in India, and over London, England, and other places, which drew considerable interest from the public.  The prints have appeared on several stamps of various countries.  Marriott later became an aviation pioneer in California.

Other inventions and innovations
Henson obtained a number of patents in widely varying areas.  Major patents include:
 Lace-making decoration, 1835
 Lightweight steam engines, 1841
 Flying machine, 1843
 T-handled safety razor, 1847

Henson invented the modern form of the razor, the 'T' shaped safety razor, and patented it in 1847: "the cutting blade of which is at right angles with the handle, and resembles somewhat the form of a common hoe."  While a major improvement on the previous form of safety razor, an additional improvement was needed to make safety razors common.  In 1901, Gillette combined Henson's T-shaped safety razor with disposable blades, and produced the modern razor.

Henson published a pamphlet on astronomy in 1871 suggesting that the Solar System formed from cold dust and gas, and discussed how it could condense into meteors and comets, and further condense into planets, moons and the Sun, in the process heating up.  He also discusses how this would lead to the planets orbiting in the ecliptic and rotating in the same general plane.

Henson created inventions in other areas as well. Among them were ice-making machines (1870), fabric waterproofing, and cistern-cleaning. He patented and submitted a proposal for an improved low-recoil breech-loading cannon design to the US Navy in 1861; it was rejected as impractical.

The Henson Aerial Steam Carriage

Small model, wingspan unknown
Medium model, wingspan 20 feet
Full-size aircraft, wingspan 150 feet (never built)

Timeline
3 May 1812 Birth in Nottingham, England
1835 UK Patent #4405 on ornamental lace-making improvements ("William Henson of Chard, machinist" - could be William Samuel Henson's father, who was also an inventor)
1840 UK Patent #6207 on making fabrics ("William Henson of Lambeth, engineer")
1841, 1842, 1843 UK Patents on lightweight steam engine and flying machine (#unknown and #9478) ("William S. Henson of Lambeth, engineer")
17 July 1847 Patent on the T-handled safety razor
1849 Emigration to the United States
1850 US Census in Newark, New Jersey as machinist
2 March 1852 US Patent on improvement to knitting looms
5 November 1861 US Patent #33646 for "Improvement in Breech-loading Ordinance".
13 October 1868 US Patent #83060 for an improvement to a steam engine governor
circa 1869-1870: working in Peru in the mining industry
26 January 1869 US Patent #86264 for improvements to centrifugal screw pumps
1870 US Census in Newark, New Jersey as civil engineer, US patent #108816 on ice-making machine
1871 Publication of book on Astronomy; listed as a Master in the Newark Masons lodge
14 July 1874 US Patent #152914 for ice-making improvements
15 May 1883 US Patent #277486 for cleaning cisterns
1888 Death in Newark, New Jersey

See also
Adelaide Gallery
George Cayley, aviation pioneer
John Chapman, engineer

References

External links

Chard Museum
BBC: William Henson
Flying Machines: William Henson
Hargrave: William Henson

1812 births
1888 deaths
History of aviation
Aviation inventors
People from Chard, Somerset
People from Newark, New Jersey
Steam-powered aircraft
Burials at Rosedale Cemetery (Orange, New Jersey)